Following is a list of the 1993 FIFA World Youth Championship squads.  The FIFA U-20 World Cup, until 2005 known as the FIFA World Youth Championship, is the world championship of football for male players under the age of 20 and is organized by Fédération Internationale de Football Association (FIFA). The Championship has been awarded every two years since the first tournament in 1977 held in Tunisia.

Group A

Head coach:  Les Scheinflug

Head coach:  Jean Manga-Onguene

Head coach:  Reinaldo Rueda

Head coach:  Aleksandr Piskaryov

 Beschastnykh was selected but Spartak Moscow did not release him.

Group B

Head coach:  Rainer Bonhof

Head coach:  Fred Osam

Head coach:  Agostinho Oliveira

Head coach:  Angel Castelnoble

Group C

Head coach:  David Burnside

Head coach:  Park Sang-in

Head coach:  Serpil Hamdi Tüzün

Head coach:  Bobby Howe

Group D

Head coach:  Júlio César Leal

Head coach:  Juan de Dios Castillo

Head coach:  Bjørn Hansen

Head coach:  Carlos Roberto Cabral

References

External links
FIFA.com

FIFA U-20 World Cup squads
Fifa World Youth Championship Squads, 1993